WCDO (1490 kHz) is an AM radio station broadcasting an adult contemporary format licensed to Sidney, New York, United States. The station is owned by Dave Mance under the name of CDO Broadcasting, Inc., and features programming from Compass Media Networks, United Stations Radio Networks, and Westwood One.

The station simulcasts its sister station WCDO-FM 100.9.

History
The station went on the air as WCDO on January 18, 1982. On August 1, 1984, it changed its call sign to WSID and on July 6, 1985, to the current WCDO.

References

External links

CDO
Mainstream adult contemporary radio stations in the United States
Radio stations established in 1982
1982 establishments in New York (state)